Lost Lake is a shallow closed-basin lake in the Willamette National Forest   southwest of Mount Jefferson and east of Santiam Junction, Oregon, United States.

Geologically, much of the area surrounding the lake is lava bed created during a period of volcanic activity around 1000 BCE in the Cascade Range of Oregon.
Water levels on the lake change significantly over the seasons; in spring, autumn, and winter the lake is a popular fishing location, but during the summer the lake drains completely through lava tube drain holes in the bottom of the lake. Open lava tubes are scattered around the region, and the nearby Fish Lake is another lake with underwater drain holes. Over the years, locals have attempted to fill in the drain holes with debris, and used heavy machinery to carve holes elsewhere in the lakebed to keep some water from draining out.

References

Lakes of Oregon
Lakes of Linn County, Oregon
Willamette National Forest
Lava fields